Nicky George Nicolau (born 12 October 1983) is an English footballer of Greek Cypriot origin who plays as a midfielder. He last played for Bishops Stortford in 2015.

Early career
Born in St Pancras, London, Nicolau started his career with Arsenal, winning the FA Youth Cup in 2001, but never broke into the first team after spending 10 years at the club. He has been capped by Cyprus at U-17, U-19 and U-21 level, with 3 caps for the U-21s.

Career
On 25 March 2004 he joined Southend United on loan, making his Football League debut two days later in the club's 2–1 victory at Carlisle United. Having impressed in his loan spell, in May 2004 he agreed a one-year contract to join the club on a permanent basis. In the 2004–05 season, Nicolau helped Southend reach a second consecutive Football League Trophy final, and win promotion from League Two via the playoffs he was offered a new one-year contract with the club. However, he turned the offer down hoping to improve the terms of the offer which were at the same rate of pay as his previous contract. After five weeks of impasse, Southend United withdrew the offer and Nicolau signed for Swindon Town the following day. He had a loan spell at Hereford United where he made 11 appearances, scoring 1 goal and was released by Swindon at the end of the 2005–06 season.

Nicolau spent the following season at Barnet, and was released by the club after one season, before manager Paul Fairclough changed his mind and decided to offer Nicolau a new contract. He left the club at the end of the 2007–08 season after turning down a new contract. After a trial at Brighton & Hove Albion, he moved on trial with Grimsby Town in August 2008 and played in a behind closed doors friendly against Winterton Rangers but despite impressing in the game, manager Alan Buckley decided to let Nicolau leave the club the following day. Nicolau re-signed for the Bees in September 2008, turning down an offer from Omonia Nicosia in Cyprus as he would have to complete national service, before leaving the club for a third time at the end of the season.

In September 2009 he joined Woking on a non-contract basis, before signing a contract until the end of the season shortly after. In August 2010, he signed for Dover Athletic of the Conference South, before joining Boreham Wood in November.

On 12 July 2011, he signed a one-year contract with Lincoln City. He was released at the end of the 2012–13 season.

On 29 May 2013, he signed for Conference South club Chelmsford City.

Honours
Arsenal
FA Youth Cup Winner: 2001

Southend United
League Two (IV): Playoffs 2005

References

External links

1983 births
Living people
Footballers from St Pancras, London
English footballers
Cypriot footballers
Association football midfielders
Arsenal F.C. players
Southend United F.C. players
Swindon Town F.C. players
Hereford United F.C. players
Barnet F.C. players
Woking F.C. players
Dover Athletic F.C. players
Boreham Wood F.C. players
Lincoln City F.C. players
Chelmsford City F.C. players
Welling United F.C. players
Bishop's Stortford F.C. players
English Football League players
National League (English football) players
English people of Greek Cypriot descent